Ann C. Russey Cannon is an American statistics educator, the Watson M. Davis Professor of Mathematics and Statistics at Cornell College in Iowa. , she was the only statistician at Cornell College.

Cannon is a graduate of Grinnell College, and completed a doctorate in statistics at Iowa State University in 1994. Her dissertation, Signal Detection Using Categorical Temporal Data, was jointly supervised by William Q. Meeker Jr. and Noel Cressie.

Cannon is one of the co-authors of the statistics textbook Stat2: Building Models for a World of Data (W. H. Freeman, 2013). The second edition of this textbook was released under the title Stat2: Modeling with Regression and ANOVA (W.H. Freeman, 2019).

In 2019 she was elected as a Fellow of the American Statistical Association.

References

External links
Contact information

Year of birth missing (living people)
Living people
American statisticians
Women statisticians
Cornell College faculty
Fellows of the American Statistical Association